Nepami may refer to :
 Newar people
 Nepali people

Language and nationality disambiguation pages